The Minden United States Post Office is a historic building in Minden, Nebraska. It was built in 1936–1937, and designed in the Modernistic style by architect William E. L. Bunn. Inside, there is a  Works Progress Administration mural in memory of 1848 Fort Kearny, completed in 1939 by artist William E. L. Bunn. The building was listed on the National Register of Historic Places in 1992 as U.S. Post Office-Minden.

References

Post office buildings on the National Register of Historic Places in Nebraska
National Register of Historic Places in Kearney County, Nebraska
Moderne architecture in the United States
Government buildings completed in 1937